Cristo Satánico (Satanic Christ) is the second album released by deathgrind band Asesino.

Track listing

Personnel

Asesino
Asesino (Dino Cazares) – rhythm guitar, production
Maldito X (Tony Campos) – bass, vocals
El Sadistico (Emilio Márquez) – drums

Other personnel
El Odio (Jamey Jasta) – backing vocals ("Regresando Odio")
Sepulculo (Andreas Kisser) – lead guitar ("Rituales Salvajes", "Twiquiado", "Perro Primero")
Santos - backing vocals ("Rituales Salvajes"), add. vocals ("Y Tu Mamá También")
La Ametralladora - female voices ("Y Tu Mamá También")
Logan Mader – engineering
Roy Mayorga – sound design

Asesino albums
2006 albums